Nero, in comics, may refer:

 Nero (DC Comics), a DC Comics character.
 Nero of The Adventures of Nero, in Flemish: De Avonturen van Detectief Van Zwam and De Avonturen van Nero & Co

See also
Nero (disambiguation)
Neron, a DC Comics supervillain